Michael Katz is an Austrian film producer. He has produced films for cinematic release as well as made-for-television movies and television series. He has worked with Michael Haneke on most of his films, including Amour. He was nominated for the Academy Award for Best Picture for Amour along with Margaret Menegoz, Stefan Arndt and Veit Heiduschka in 2013.

Selected filmography
 Sternberg - Shooting Star (1989)
 Benny's Video (1992)
 Der Fall Lucana (1993)
 Die 3 Posträuber (1998)
 The Piano Teacher (2001)
 Everyman's Feast (2002)
 Time of the Wolf (2003)
 Welcome Home (2004)
 Caché (2005)
 For a Moment, Freedom (2008), executive producer
 The White Ribbon (2009)
 Local Hero (2010)
 Kuma (2011)
 Als der Weihnachtsmann vom Himmel fiel (2011)
 Amour (2012)
 Beloved Sisters (2013)
 Cracks in Concrete (2013)
 Hangover in High Heels (2014)

Notes

External links

Living people
Austrian film producers
1954 births